Julius Gius (December 31, 1911 – October 18, 1996) was an editor of the Ventura County Star-Free Press.  He expanded the paper's circulation during this time. He was also the editorial director for the San Diego-based Scripps Newspapers. He then took over a weekly newspaper in Thousand Oaks, made it a daily and increased its circulation. He retired in 1987.

He was inducted into the California Newspaper Hall of Fame
in 1999.

In 1980 he founded the charitable "Bellringer" program, which every Christmas collects donations from the community which is given to local Salvation Army groups to help people in need.

He died in Ventura, California, aged 84, in 1996.

References

1911 births
1996 deaths
American newspaper editors
American publishers (people)
Businesspeople from San Diego
People from Ventura, California
Place of birth missing
Journalists from California
20th-century American businesspeople
20th-century American journalists
American male journalists